George Green (14 July 1793 – 31 May 1841) was a British mathematical physicist who wrote An Essay on the Application of Mathematical Analysis to the Theories of Electricity and Magnetism in 1828. The essay introduced several important concepts, among them a theorem similar to the modern Green's theorem, the idea of potential functions as currently used in physics, and the concept of what are now called Green's functions. Green was the first person to create a mathematical theory of electricity and magnetism and his theory formed the foundation for the work of other scientists such as James Clerk Maxwell, William Thomson, and others. His work on potential theory ran parallel to that of Carl Friedrich Gauss.

Green's life story is remarkable in that he was almost entirely self-taught. He received only about one year of formal schooling as a child, between the ages of 8 and 9.

Early life 

Green was born and lived for most of his life in the English town of Sneinton, Nottinghamshire, now part of the city of Nottingham. His father, also named George, was a baker who had built and owned a brick windmill used to grind grain.

In his youth, Green was described as having a frail constitution and a dislike for doing work in his father's bakery. He had no choice in the matter, however, and as was common for the time he likely began working daily to earn his living at the age of five.

Robert Goodacre's Academy 
During this era it was common for only 25–50% of children in Nottingham to receive any schooling. The majority of schools were Sunday schools, run by the Church, and children would typically attend for one or two years only.
Recognizing the young Green's above average intellect, and being in a strong financial situation due to his successful bakery, his father enrolled him in March 1801 at Robert Goodacre's Academy in Upper Parliament Street. Robert Goodacre was a well-known science populariser and educator of the time. He published Essay on the Education of Youth, in which he wrote that he did not "study the interest of the boy but the embryo Man". To a non-specialist, he would have seemed deeply knowledgeable in science and mathematics, but a close inspection of his essay and curriculum revealed that the extent of his mathematical teachings was limited to algebra, trigonometry and logarithms. Thus, Green's later mathematical contributions, which exhibited knowledge of very modern developments in mathematics, could not have resulted from his tenure at the Robert Goodacre Academy. He stayed for only four terms (one school year), and it was speculated by his contemporaries that he had exhausted all they had to teach him.

Move from Nottingham to Sneinton 
In 1773 George's father moved to Nottingham, which at the time had a reputation for being a pleasant town with open spaces and wide roads. By 1831, however, the population had increased nearly five times, in part due to the budding industrial revolution, and the city became known as one of the worst slums in England. There were frequent riots by starving workers, often associated with special hostility towards bakers and millers on the suspicion that they were hiding grain to drive up food prices.

For these reasons, in 1807, George Green senior bought a plot of land in Sneinton. On this plot of land he built a "brick wind corn mill", now referred to as Green's Windmill. It was technologically impressive for its time, but required nearly twenty-four-hour maintenance, which was to become Green's burden for the next twenty years.

Adult life

Miller 
Just as with baking, Green found the responsibilities of operating the mill annoying and tedious. Grain from the fields was arriving continuously at the mill's doorstep, and the sails of the windmill had to be constantly adjusted to the windspeed, both to prevent damage in high winds, and to maximise rotational speed in low winds. The millstones that would continuously grind against each other, could wear down or cause a fire if they ran out of grain to grind. Every month the stones, which weighed over a ton, would have to be replaced or repaired.

Family life 
In 1823 Green formed a relationship with Jane Smith, the daughter of William Smith, hired by Green Senior as mill manager. Although Green and Jane Smith never married, Jane eventually became known as Jane Green and the couple had seven children together; all but the first had Green as a baptismal name. The youngest child was born 13 months before Green's death. Green provided for his common-law wife and children in his will.

Nottingham Subscription Library 
When Green was thirty, he became a member of the Nottingham Subscription Library. This library exists today, and was likely the main source of Green's advanced mathematical knowledge. Unlike more conventional libraries, the subscription library was exclusive to a hundred or so subscribers, and the first on the list of subscribers was the Duke of Newcastle. This library catered to requests for specialised books and journals that satisfied the particular interests of their subscribers.

1828 essay 

In 1828, Green published An Essay on the Application of Mathematical Analysis to the Theories of Electricity and Magnetism, which is the essay he is most famous for today. It was published privately at the author's expense, because he thought it would be presumptuous for a person like himself, with no formal education in mathematics, to submit the paper to an established journal. When Green published his Essay, it was sold on a subscription basis to 51 people, most of whom were friends who probably could not understand it.

The wealthy landowner and mathematician Sir Edward Bromhead bought a copy and encouraged Green to do further work in mathematics. Not believing the offer was sincere, Green did not contact Bromhead for two years.

Mathematician 
By the time Green's father died in 1829, the senior Green had become one of the gentry due to his considerable accumulated wealth and land owned, roughly half of which he left to his son and the other half to his daughter. The young Green, now thirty-six years old, consequently was able to use this wealth to abandon his miller duties and pursue mathematical studies.

Cambridge 
Members of the Nottingham Subscription Library who knew Green repeatedly insisted that he obtain a proper University education. In particular, one of the library's most prestigious subscribers was Sir Edward Bromhead, with whom Green shared many correspondences; he insisted that Green go to Cambridge.

In 1832, aged nearly forty, Green was admitted as an undergraduate at Gonville and Caius College, Cambridge. He was particularly insecure about his lack of knowledge of Greek and Latin, which were prerequisites, but it turned out not to be as hard for him to learn these as he had envisaged, as the degree of expected mastery was not as high as he had expected. In the mathematics examinations, he won the first-year mathematical prize. He graduated with a BA in 1838 as a 4th Wrangler (the 4th highest scoring student in his graduating class, coming after James Joseph Sylvester who scored 2nd).

College fellow 
Following his graduation, Green was elected a fellow of the Cambridge Philosophical Society. Even without his stellar academic standing, the Society had already read and made note of his Essay and three other publications, so Green was welcomed.

The next two years provided an unparalleled opportunity for Green to read, write, and discuss his scientific ideas. In this short time he published an additional six publications with applications to hydrodynamics, sound, and optics.

Final years and posthumous fame 

In his final years at Cambridge, Green became rather ill, and in 1840 he returned to Sneinton, only to die a year later. There are rumours that at Cambridge, Green had "succumbed to alcohol", and some of his earlier supporters, such as Sir Edward Bromhead, tried to distance themselves from him.
 

Green's work was not well known in the mathematical community during his lifetime. Besides Green himself, the first mathematician to quote his 1828 work was the Briton Robert Murphy (1806–1843) in his 1833 work. In 1845, four years after Green's death, Green's work was rediscovered by the young William Thomson (then aged 21), later known as Lord Kelvin, who popularised it for future mathematicians. According to the book "George Green" by D.M. Cannell, William Thomson noticed Murphy's citation of Green's 1828 essay but found it difficult to locate Green's 1828 work; he finally got some copies of Green's 1828 work from William Hopkins in 1845.

In 1871 N. M. Ferrers assembled The Mathematical Papers of the late George Green for publication.

Green's work on the motion of waves in a canal (resulting in what is known as Green's law) anticipates the WKB approximation of quantum mechanics, while his research on light-waves and the properties of the Aether produced what is now known as the Cauchy-Green tensor. Green's theorem and functions were important tools in classical mechanics, and were revised by Schwinger's 1948 work on electrodynamics that led to his 1965 Nobel prize (shared with Feynman and Tomonaga). Green's functions later also proved useful in analysing superconductivity. On a visit to Nottingham in 1930, Albert Einstein commented that Green had been 20 years ahead of his time. The theoretical physicist Julian Schwinger, who used Green's functions in his ground-breaking works, published a tribute entitled "The Greening of Quantum Field Theory: George and I" in 1993.

The George Green Library at the University of Nottingham is named after him, and houses the majority of the university's science and engineering Collection. The George Green Institute for Electromagnetics Research, a research group in the University of Nottingham engineering department, is also named after him. In 1986, Green's Windmill was restored to working order. It now serves both as a working example of a 19th-century windmill and as a museum and science centre dedicated to Green.

Westminster Abbey has a memorial stone for Green in the nave adjoining the graves of Sir Isaac Newton and Lord Kelvin.

His work and influence on 19th-century applied physics had been largely forgotten until the publication of his biography by Mary Cannell in 1993.

Source of knowledge 
It is unclear to historians exactly where Green obtained information on current developments in mathematics, as Nottingham had little in the way of intellectual resources. What is even more mysterious is that Green had used "the Mathematical Analysis," a form of calculus derived from Leibniz that was virtually unheard of, or even actively discouraged, in England at the time (due to Leibniz being a contemporary of Newton who had his own methods that were championed in England). This form of calculus, and the developments of mathematicians such as the French mathematicians Laplace, Lacroix and Poisson were not taught even at Cambridge, let alone Nottingham, and yet Green not only had heard of these developments, but improved upon them.

It is speculated that only one person educated in mathematics, John Toplis, headmaster of Nottingham High School 1806–1819, graduate from Cambridge as 11th Wrangler and an enthusiast of French mathematics, lived in Nottingham at the time.

List of publications 
 An Essay on the Application of Mathematical Analysis to the Theories of Electricity and Magnetism. By George Green, Nottingham. Printed for the Author by T. Wheelhouse, Nottingham. 1828. (Quarto, vii + 72 pages.)
  Presented 12 November 1832.
  Presented 6 May 1833.
  Presented 16 December 1833.
  Presented 11 December 1837.
  Presented 15 May 1837.
  Presented 11 December 1837.
  Presented 18 February 1839.
  Presented 6 May 1839.
  Presented 20 May 1839.

Notes

References 
 Ivor Grattan-Guinness, 'Green, George (1793–1841)', Oxford Dictionary of National Biography, Oxford University Press, 2004 accessed 26 May 2009
 D. M. Cannell, "George Green mathematician and physicist 1793–1841", The Athlone Press, London, 1993.
  (Note: This was the first quotation of Green's 1828 work by somebody other than Green himself.)
 
  – An excellent on-line source of George Green information

External links
 List of References for George Green
 
 

19th-century English mathematicians
English physicists
Mathematical analysts
Alumni of Gonville and Caius College, Cambridge
Fellows of Gonville and Caius College, Cambridge
People from Sneinton
1793 births
1841 deaths
Tourist attractions in Nottinghamshire
Nottingham